Qaleh Khach (also Romanized as Qal‘eh Khāch; also known as Qalameh Khāch and Qalameh Qāch) is a village in Avajiq-e Jonubi Rural District, Dashtaki District, Chaldoran County, West Azerbaijan Province, Iran. At the 2006 census, its population was 229, in 40 families.

References 

Populated places in Chaldoran County